Everybody Everybody may refer to:

 "Everybody Everybody" (song), a 1990 song by Black Box
 Everybody Everybody (album), a 1999 compilation album by Viper